The Jinhua–Wenzhou railway, also known as the Jinwen line, is a railway in Zhejiang Province, China, connecting Jinhua and Wenzhou. It is the first railway with the investment from a joint venture, between Chinese government-owned corporations and privately held companies in mainland China. The construction of this -long rail line began on December 18, 1992, and it was opened on June 11, 1998. Upon the completion of its construction, all of the share owned by private shareholders has been transferred to state-own corporations. The railway is now under the supervision of CR Shanghai.

A major upgrade along this route was carried out as the Jinhua–Wenzhou high-speed railway or Jinhua–Wenzhou Rail Expansion Project. This project opened in December 2015.

Railway stations

Jinyun railway station

Jinyun railway station is a railway station in Jinyun County, Lishui, Zhejiang, China. It is an intermediate stop on the Jinhua–Wenzhou railway.

See also

List of railway lines in China

References

External links 
 Official website (in Chinese)

Railway lines in China
Rail transport in Zhejiang
Jinhua
Transport in Wenzhou
Railway lines opened in 1998